= Sans fil (newspaper) =

French newspaper

- Type: Daily
- Founded: 1922
- Language: French language
- Headquarters: 4, rue du Faubourg, Montmartre, Paris 48°52′18.5″N 2°20′35.4″E

Sans fil was a daily newspaper published from Paris, France, founded in 1922. The newspaper was published by the "Sans Fil" Information Agency. As of the mid-1930s, Albert Ebingre served as general director of the newspaper and Victor Pardon as its editor-in-chief. Key contributors included Egdar Allix (Professor of Law) and Bastid (Member of Parliament, head of the Foreign Affairs Commission).
